Press Council may refer to:

 International Press Telecommunications Council, a consortium of the world's major news agencies and news industry vendors
 Australian Press Council
 Danish Press Council, a Danish independent public tribunal press council under the Ministry of Justice
 Myanmar Press Council
 New Zealand Press Council, an industry body that oversees complaints against print media
 Ontario Press Council
 Press Council of India, a statutory body in India that governs the conduct of the print and broadcast media
 Press Council (UK), a British voluntary press organisation that was succeeded by the Press Complaints Commission in 1990
 Swedish Press Council